Dawa Tshering is a Bhutanese international footballer. He made his first appearance in their final 2018 World Cup qualifying match against the Maldives.

References

Bhutanese footballers
Bhutan international footballers
Living people
Association football forwards
1995 births